This article refers to the situation of crime in the U.S. state of New York.

In 2012, there were 451,142 crimes reported in the state of New York, including 686 murders. In 2014, 409,386 crimes were reported in the state, including 616 murders.

Crime in Yonkers
In 2000 The New York Times reported that there were at least 30 street gangs operating in Yonkers. Mexican immigrants have contributed to the rise of Mexican gangs in Yonkers. The largest Mexican gangs operating in Yonkers in 2000 were Chicano Nation, Aztec Pride, Vatos Locos and 13 Locos. A district attorney for Westchester County attributed the high levels of gang activity to strict law enforcement practices within the city limits of New York City. Gang units collected intelligence on gangs by photographing gang tags and passing the data on to graffiti cleanup crews.

22 gang members were charged with narcotics and firearms offenses in 2012 in three federal indictments in the United States District Court for the Southern District of New York. United States v. Mark David et al charged the gang with intent to distribute crack cocaine and marijuana, and firearms charges related to that offense. In 2016 the United States Department of Justice announced that Da'quan Johnson had been sentenced to 30 years for murder, racketeering and narcotics crimes that he committed as a member of street gang based in Yonkers.

Gang violence was the source of over half the shootings in Yonkers in 2020. Shootings were up 60% in 2020 compared with the previous year, and gang related shootings were up 30%. Mayor Mike Spano and the Yonkers Police Department announced that the rise of gang violence would be met with increased surveillance, law enforcement and collaboration with federal officials.

Crime in New York City 

Crime rates in New York City spiked over the post-war period as the city experienced white flight. The highest crime totals were recorded in the late 1980s and early 1990s as the crack epidemic surged, and then dropped through the 1990s and 2000s.

During the 1990s, the New York City Police Department (NYPD) adopted CompStat, broken windows policing, and other strategies in a major effort to reduce crime. The city's dramatic drop in crime has been variously attributed to a number of factors, including the end of the crack epidemic, the increased incarceration rate, gentrification, an aging population, and the decline of lead poisoning in children.

The boroughs of Queens and Staten Island have historically had lower crime rates compared to Brooklyn, The Bronx and Manhattan. Since 1985, Brooklyn has consistently had the highest murder and violent crime rate among the five boroughs.

Since 2017, murders in the city have increased bucking the trend. Murders in New York City surged in 2020 by 47% to 468 from 319 the year prior, one of the most significant increases in the city's history, but still lower than any year between 1960 and 2011. There were 488 murders in 2021, the highest total since 2011.

Policing 

In 2008, the state of New York had 514 state and local law enforcement agencies. Those agencies employed a total of 95,105 staff. Of the total staff, 66,472 were sworn officers (defined as those with general arrest powers).

In 2008, New York had 341 police officers per 100,000 residents.

Capital punishment laws

Capital punishment is not applied in this state., but in the past it was. The last execution took place in 1963, when Eddie Mays was electrocuted at Sing Sing Prison. The state was the first to adopt the electric chair as a method of execution, which replaced hanging. Following the U.S. Supreme Court's ruling declaring existing capital punishment statutes unconstitutional in Furman v. Georgia (1972), New York was without a death penalty until 1995, when then-Governor George Pataki signed a new statute into law, which provided for execution by lethal injection. In June 2004, the state's highest court ruled in People v. LaValle that the state's death penalty statute violated the state constitution,

Human trafficking

New York has one of the highest rates of human trafficking in the country, partially due to its large immigrant population and status as a major port of entry.  According to a 2011 Department of State report, New York, together with California, Texas, and Oklahoma, has the largest concentrations of survivors of human trafficking.

See also
 Law of New York
 List of shootings in New York (state)

References